Joseph Henry "Chief" Jones (b. December 18, 1879 – d. October 30, 1959) was a professional ice hockey goaltender who played in many games in various professional and amateur leagues, including the National Hockey Association and International Professional Hockey League. 

Amongst the teams Jones played with were the Cobalt Silver Kings. He was a "full blooded Indian" who hailed from Michigan. Before he played with Cobalt, he played with the St. Paul Victorias in St. Paul, Minnesota and in the International Professional Hockey League with a team in Sault Ste. Marie, Michigan from the league's inaugural year until the 1908–09 season, when he signed with the Cobalt Hockey Club. He played for Waterloo in the  Ontario Professional Hockey League the following hockey season. He retired after that season.

Career statistics

Regular season

Playoffs

Source: Society for International Hockey Research Database

References

1879 births
1959 deaths
Canadian ice hockey goaltenders
Cobalt Silver Kings players
Ice hockey people from Ontario
Michigan Soo Indians players
People from Renfrew County
Portage Lakes Hockey Club players